George Putnam Riley (March 29, 1833 in Boston – October 1, 1905) was an African-American abolitionist in the United States. He was referred to as the "Fred Douglass of Oregon" by the Oregonian newspaper.

Life and career 
George Putnam Riley (Geo P. Riley) was a native of Boston born on March 29, 1833. His grandfather was a participant in the Revolutionary War. Riley's father was engaged in the clothing trade in Boston. His parents, William and Elizabeth Riley, were abolitionists. When Riley was a baby, his six-year-old half-brother James Jackson Jr. died.

Riley was prevented from attending college because he was black. He worked at Benjamin Butler's law office, and later as a barber. George moved to San Francisco in the historic California Gold Rush, and later moved back to Boston. Harriet Elizabeth Gordon and he wed on April 30, 1866 in Chelsea, Massachusetts. They had a daughter in 1867.

Riley moved to Oregon by early 1869. In Portland, he was employed by the federal customs department. He also briefly worked as a barber again.

In 1869, Riley and twelve other Black men and two white men, organized the Workingmen's Joint Stock Association (WJSA) in Portland, Oregon. Riley was president of the WJSA. They bought property in Seattle (20 acres) and Tacoma on speculation. The land was under litigation at the time of his death, where it had been under litigation for more than 20 years.

In 1887 he moved to Tacoma, Washington. There, he orated Tacoma's Annual Emancipation Day festivities, and worked to resolve legal disputes relating to the properties belonging to WJSA in Tacoma.

Harriet Riley died in 1896, and Riley died on October 1, 1905. Congressman F.W. Cushman attended his funeral and spoke about the lessons learned from Riley's life.

Politics 
Riley was a Republican, described as, "the ablest orator among the Republicans of Multnomah County." He was a candidate for legislature, but did not win. In a "card" published in an Oregon newspaper Riley writes:Portland, May 14, 1878

Editor Standard: -Noticing an article in your paper requesting me to reply to a question as to why I was not indorsed [sic] by the Republican Convention, or rather a clique who assume to be dictators of the party, I have only to remark that while they admit I have the ability, they discarded me on account of color. - Geo. Putnam Riley.

Legacy 
Riley had one daughter, Bonita Riley Wright. She was a founding member of the Seattle NAACP in 1913.

In 2004, a housing and commercial development group in Seattle was named in honor of George Riley Putnam. The company has taken its roots since 1983 as a result of the activities of African American businessmen followers of Riley.

Speeches 

 1870, April 7, "The Ratification Jubilee", Portland, Oregon

 1870, April 26, "The Colored Citizen and the Ballot", Portland, Oregon

 1871, February 7, "Toussaint L'Ouverture, the Hero of San Domingo", Salem, Oregon

References

Further reading 
 
 

1833 births
1905 deaths
African-American people
African-American history in Portland, Oregon
African-American history of Oregon
American abolitionists